Album II is the second studio album American singer Kem. It was released by Motown Records on May 17, 2005 in the United States. The album debuted at number five on the US Billboard 200 with first-weeks sales of 140,000 copies, also topping the US Top R&B/Hip-Hop Albums. In 2014, it was certified platinum by the Recording Industry Association of America (RIAA). Album II  spawned the single "I Can't Stop Loving You" which became a hit on adult contemporary R&B radio stations, reaching number 20 on the Hot R&B/Hip-Hop Songs.

Critical reception

Andy Kellman, writing for Allmusic, found that Kem's "kind of R&B is kicked-back with sparse arrangements made elegantly rich with starlit keyboards, subtle guitar flicks, and feminine vocals. Understated but assured, his vocals exhibit a lot of range despite almost always remaining at the volume of a bedroom whisper. So he's really out place in the early 2000s, not stylistically disparate from what you'd hear late at night on a soul station in the late '70s or early '80s. On Album II, there's no stab taken at finding a younger or different audience."

Chart performance
Album II debuted at number five on the US Billboard 200 with 140,000 copies sold in the first week released. Two months later, it was certified gold by the Recording Industry Association of America (RIAA) with an excess of 500,000 copies sold. In 2014, the album was certified platinum.

Track listing 
All songs written by Kem except where noted.
 "Find Your Way (Back in My Life)" – 4:34
 "Heaven" – 6:23
 "Into You" – 5:04
 "I Can't Stop Loving You" – 5:25
 "Without You" – 4:10
 "Set You Free" – 4:28
 "I'm in Love" – 4:34
 "True Love" – 4:27
 "Each Other" – 3:46
 "You Might Win" – 3:48
 "I Get Lifted" (Richard Finch, Harry Wayne Casey) – 4:05

Production 
 Produced By Kem & Carlos Gunn (co-produced vocals)
 Engineers: Carlos Gunn, Eric Morgeson
 Assistant Engineers: Isaiah Abolin, Brian Russell
 Mixing: Ray Bardani
 Mastering: Chris Gehringer

Personnel 
 Kem: Keyboards, Lead & Backing Vocals
 Brian O'Neal: Keyboards, Synthesizers
 Quentin Baxter, Reggie McTaw: Guitars
 David McMurray: Saxophone
 Stevie Wonder: Harmonica
 Fred Robinson, Al Turner: Bass
 Ron Otis: Drums
 Marlon Curry: Percussion

Charts

Weekly charts

Year-end charts

Certifications

References

External links 
 Kem – Album II (CD) at Discogs

Kem (singer) albums
2005 albums
Motown albums